Manuel Cortina Martínez (born July 21, 1983, in Veracruz) is a Mexican canoeist. He participated in the 2007 Pan American Games and obtained three gold medals in canoe sprint.

Martínez also competed at the 2008 Summer Olympics in Beijing, but was eliminated in the semifinals of both the K-1 500 m and the K-1 1000 m events.

References
Sports-Reference.com profile

1983 births
Canoeists at the 2007 Pan American Games
Canoeists at the 2008 Summer Olympics
Canoeists at the 2011 Pan American Games
Mexican male canoeists
Living people
Olympic canoeists of Mexico
Sportspeople from Veracruz
Pan American Games gold medalists for Mexico
Pan American Games bronze medalists for Mexico
Pan American Games medalists in canoeing
Central American and Caribbean Games gold medalists for Mexico
Central American and Caribbean Games silver medalists for Mexico
Central American and Caribbean Games bronze medalists for Mexico
Competitors at the 2006 Central American and Caribbean Games
Central American and Caribbean Games medalists in canoeing
Medalists at the 2007 Pan American Games
21st-century Mexican people